The Central Avenue Historic District in Pewee Valley, Kentucky is a  historic district which was listed on the National Register of Historic Places in 1989.  It included 21 contributing buildings, two contributing structures, and a contributing site.

The district runs along Central Ave. from Peace Ln. to Mt. Mercy Dr. and covers 17 residences and businesses with their outbuildings.

References

Historic districts on the National Register of Historic Places in Kentucky
Italianate architecture in Kentucky
Buildings and structures completed in 1851
National Register of Historic Places in Oldham County, Kentucky
Buildings and structures in Pewee Valley, Kentucky